Marci és a kapitány is a Hungarian series of  puppet films from 1977.

Narrators 

 Captain: Lajos Varanyi
 Mrs Orsolya: Irén Szöllősy
 Anikó: Ildikó Simándi
 Marci: Gertrúd Havas
 Béka: István Bölöni Kiss
 Bernát: Hugó Gruber

List of episodes 
 Ki a jó gyermek?
 Ki esik a vízbe?
 Az emberrablók
 Hinta-palinta
 Érdemes hegyet mászni
 Orsolya néni születésnapja
 Selyemhajú Stefánia
 Hol a szemüveg?
 Hét tenger ördöge
 A kedvező szél
 Hajótörés
 Palackposta
 ?

External links 
 

1977 films
Hungarian animated films